Kathiatali is a town in Nagaon district, Assam, India. It is located at an elevation of 196 m above MSL. Kathiatali is connected by National Highway 36 to Nagaon.

References

External links
 Satellite map of Kathiatali
 Wikimapia
 About Kathiatali

Cities and towns in Nagaon district